The Churchill Barriers are four causeways in the Orkney islands with a total length of .  They link the Orkney Mainland in the north to the island of South Ronaldsay via Burray and the two smaller islands of Lamb Holm and Glimps Holm.

The barriers were built between May 1940 and September 1944, primarily as naval defences to protect the anchorage at Scapa Flow, but since 12 May 1945, serve as road links between the islands. The two southern barriers, Glimps Holm to Burray and Burray to South Ronaldsay, are Category A listed.

History

On 14 October 1939, the Royal Navy battleship HMS Royal Oak was sunk at her moorings within the natural harbour of Scapa Flow, by the  under the command of Günther Prien.  U-47 had entered Scapa Flow through Holm Sound, one of several eastern entrances to Scapa Flow.

The eastern passages were protected by measures including sunken block ships, booms and anti-submarine nets, but U-47 entered at night at high tide by navigating between the block ships.
 
To prevent further attacks, the First Lord of The Admiralty Winston Churchill ordered the construction of permanent barriers.  Work began in May 1940 and the barriers were completed in September 1944 but were not officially opened until 12 May 1945, four days after Victory in Europe Day.

Construction

The contract for building the barriers was awarded to Balfour Beatty, although part of the southernmost barrier (between Burray and South Ronaldsay) was sub-contracted to William Tawse & Co.  The first Resident Superintending Civil Engineer was E K Adamson, succeeded in 1942 by G Gordon Nicol.

Preparatory work on the site began in May 1940, while experiments on models for the design were undertaken at Whitworth Engineering Laboratories at the University of Manchester.

The bases of the barriers were built from gabions enclosing 250,000 tonnes of broken rock, from quarries on Orkney. The bases were then covered with 66,000 locally cast concrete blocks in five-tonne and ten-tonne sizes. The five-tonne blocks were laid on the core, and the ten-tonne blocks were arranged on the sides in a random pattern to act as wave-breaks.

Labour

A project of this size required a substantial labour force, which peaked in 1943 at over 2,000.

Much of the labour was provided by over 1,300 Italian prisoners of war who had been captured in the desert war in North Africa; they were transported to Orkney from early 1942 onwards.

The prisoners were accommodated in three camps, 600 at Camp 60 on Little Holm and the remaining 700 at two camps on Burray.

In 1943, those at Camp 60 built an ornate Italian Chapel, which still survives and has become a tourist attraction.

Ecological impact
Research by the University of York published in 2012 showed significant changes to the ecology of the area, and that behind the barriers an eutrophic environment dominated due to the loss of the natural throughflow of water.

Deterioration
In October 2011, the Orkney Islands Council took control of the barriers from the Ministry of Defence. Since then, with increasingly erratic weather events and rising sea levels as a result of global climate change, the barriers have begun to deteriorate. Of the four barriers, only Barrier No. 2, from Lamb Holm to Glimps Holm, is at high risk for needing to be replaced, according to the Scottish Environment Protection Agency. Replacing even one of the causeways is extremely unpopular in Orkney due to their historical significance. The Council was as of February 2021 exploring options that would preserve all of the causeways.

Gallery

References

External links
 Burray and The Barriers
 Undiscovered Scotland: The Churchill Barriers
 Our Past History: The Churchill Barriers
 Okneypics.com: photos of the barrier

Orkney
Buildings and structures in Scotland
Civil engineering
Category A listed buildings in Orkney
Causeways in Europe